In mathematics, the Tarski–Seidenberg theorem states that a set in (n + 1)-dimensional space defined by polynomial equations and inequalities can be projected down onto n-dimensional space, and the resulting set is still definable in terms of polynomial identities and inequalities.  The theorem—also known as the Tarski–Seidenberg projection property—is named after Alfred Tarski and Abraham Seidenberg. It implies that quantifier elimination is possible over the reals, that is that every formula constructed from polynomial equations and inequalities by logical connectives  (or),  (and),  (not) and quantifiers  (for all),  (exists) is equivalent to a similar formula without quantifiers. An important consequence is the decidability of the theory of real-closed fields.

Although the original proof of the theorem was constructive, the resulting algorithm has a computational complexity that is too high for using the method on a computer. George E. Collins introduced the algorithm of cylindrical algebraic decomposition, which allows quantifier elimination over the reals in double exponential time. This complexity is optimal, as there are examples where the output has a double exponential number of connected components. This algorithm is therefore fundamental, and it is widely used in computational algebraic geometry.

Statement

A semialgebraic set in Rn is a finite union of sets defined by a finite number of polynomial equations and inequalities, that is by a finite number of statements of the form

and

for polynomials p and q.  We define a projection map π : Rn&hairsp;+1 → Rn by sending a point (x1, ..., xn, xn&hairsp;+1) to (x1, ..., xn).  Then the Tarski–Seidenberg theorem states that if X is a semialgebraic set in Rn&hairsp;+1 for some n ≥ 1, then π(X) is a semialgebraic set in Rn.

Failure with algebraic sets

If we only define sets using polynomial equations and not inequalities then we define algebraic sets rather than semialgebraic sets.  For these sets the theorem fails, i.e. projections of algebraic sets need not be algebraic.  As a simple example consider the hyperbola in R2 defined by the equation

This is a perfectly good algebraic set, but projecting it down by sending (x, y) in R2 to x in R produces the set of points satisfying x ≠ 0.  This is a semialgebraic set, but it is not an algebraic set as the algebraic sets in R are R itself, the empty set and the finite sets.

This example shows also that, over the complex numbers, the projection of an algebraic set may be non-algebraic. Thus the existence of real algebraic sets with non-algebraic projections does not rely on the fact that the field of real numbers is not algebraically closed.

Another example is the parabola in R2, which is defined by the equation

Its projection onto the x-axis is the half-line [0, ∞), a semialgebraic set that cannot be obtained from algebraic sets by (finite) intersections, unions, and set complements.

Relation to structures

This result confirmed that semialgebraic sets in Rn form what is now known as an o-minimal structure on R.  These are collections of subsets Sn of Rn for each n ≥ 1 such that we can take finite unions and complements of the subsets in Sn and the result will still be in Sn, moreover the elements of S1 are simply finite unions of intervals and points.  The final condition for such a collection to be an o-minimal structure is that the projection map on the first n coordinates from Rn&hairsp;+1 to Rn must send subsets in Sn&hairsp;+1 to subsets in Sn.  The Tarski–Seidenberg theorem tells us that this holds if Sn is the set of semialgebraic sets in Rn.

See also
 Decidability of first-order theories of the real numbers

References

External links
 Tarski–Seidenberg theorem at PlanetMath.org

Real algebraic geometry
Theorems in algebraic geometry